Doris Swords Poppler (November 10, 1924 – December 12, 2004) was an American attorney who served as the United States Attorney for the District of Montana from 1990 to 1993.

She died of cancer on December 12, 2004, in Billings, Montana at age 80.

References

1924 births
2004 deaths
United States Attorneys for the District of Montana
Montana Republicans
Deaths from cancer in Montana